Tres Arroyos is a city in Buenos Aires Province, Argentina. It is the administrative seat of Tres Arroyos Partido.

The city has a sizable population of Danish and Dutch descent.

Tres Arroyos is served by Tres Arroyos Airport.

Climate
Tres Arroyos has an oceanic climate (Köppen climate classification Cfb) bordering on humid subtropical. Summers are warm while winters are mild with snowfall happening sometimes. Rain is rather evenly distributed(836mm per year), with winter being a bit drier. Sunshine is moderate, with summer being sunnier, and averages to about 200 hours a month and 2374 hours a year.

Archaeological site 

Roughly 5 km from the city of Tres Arroyos lies the "Arroyo Seco" archaeological site, which is considered to be one of the oldest yet found in Argentina. Over 40 skeletons, presumably in burial positions, were found at the site, dated to estimated age of 9000 years B.P. The site includes tools, hunting implements and fossils of extinct mammals. Much of the extensive materials are on display at the José A. Mulazzi Municipal Museum, which includes reconstructions of how the people of the time lived..

Sport
The city is home to Huracán de Tres Arroyos, a football team playing in the regional leagues, but who played in the Argentine Primera as recently as 2004-05.

References

External links

 Municipal website
  Diario La Voz Del Pueblo

Populated places in Buenos Aires Province
Populated places established in 1884
Cities in Argentina
Argentina